MS Marnix van Sint Aldegonde was a Netherland Line luxury passenger ship and cargo liner built in 1930 for service between Amsterdam and Jakarta. She operated out of Surabaya from 21 February 1940, and was requisitioned as a troopship at Singapore in May 1941 to transport Australian troops from Melbourne to Asia and Africa, and to bring 1,000 Italian prisoners of war from Egypt to Mumbai. She left the Indian Ocean in 1942, and subsequently carried Allied troops for Operation Torch, Operation Husky, and Operation Avalanche. Ship master H.W. Hettema was awarded the Distinguished Service Cross in January 1943 after his ship destroyed two attacking bombers off North Africa on 9 November 1942.

Loss

Marnix van Sint Aldegonde sailed with convoy KMF 25 on 27 October 1943. She came under attack by Kampfgeschwader 26 Dornier 217 torpedo bombers after entering the Mediterranean; and was hit by a torpedo which flooded the engine room on the evening of 6 November 1943. All personnel were safely rescued by other ships, and Marnix van Sint Aldegonde was taken in tow. The Grace Liner Santa Elena had been similarly disabled by another torpedo in the same attack; and was also taken in tow. The two ships collided while in tow, and both sank from progressive flooding the following evening.

References

1929 ships
Maritime incidents in November 1943
Ships sunk by German aircraft
Shipwrecks of Algeria
World War II shipwrecks in the Mediterranean Sea